The 19th Annual Helpmann Awards for live performance in Australia was held across two nights; the Curtain Raiser Ceremony on 14 July 2019 and the Awards Ceremony on 15 July 2019 at the Arts Centre Melbourne. Nominations were announced on 12 June 2019.

Major winners of the awards included cross-cultural play Counting & Cracking (seven awards including Best Play and Best New Australian Work), Indigenous musical Barbara and the Camp Dogs (four awards including Best Musical and Best Original Score) and opera The Magic Flute from Komische Oper Berlin (three awards including Best Opera).

Recipients and nominations

Theatre

Musicals

Opera and Classical Music

Dance and Physical Theatre

Contemporary Music

Other

Industry

Lifetime Achievement

References 

Helpmann Awards
Helpmann Awards
2019 awards in Australia
Helpmann Awards
Helpmann Awards, 18th
Helpmann Awards